Tabligbo is a city and canton in Togo with 22,304 inhabitants (2010). It is the seat of Yoto prefecture in Maritime Region.

Climate

Industry
It was the site of a cement clinker works - CIMAO cement. The plant was active from 1980 to 1984. Several attempts to restart the plant were made until 1997, when WACEM (West Africa Cement) reopened it with an infusion of funds from an Indian company. In 1998 the plant was sold to Scancem, a Norwegian corporation.

See also
 Railway stations in Togo

References

Populated places in Maritime Region
Cantons of Togo